Radulf was a Frankish military chief or official imposed as count of Nimes by Pepin the Short after suppressing an anti-Frankish revolt in 754. The Gothic Septimanian uprising took place following the assassination of Ansemund, probably by order of the Frankish king.

See also
Septimania
Islamic invasion of Gaul

8th-century Frankish nobility
Frankish warriors
People from Narbonne